This is a list of the equipment used by the Botswana Ground Force.

Firearms

Vehicles

Artillery

River-wing equipment
 2 × Boston Whaler Raider-class PCs (United States)
 10 × Panther airboats (United States)

References 

Military of Botswana
Botswana